Baharan Shahr (also Romanized as Bahārān Shahr; also known simply as Bahārān and Pārān) is a city in Pir Bakran District, in Falavarjan County, Isfahan Province, Iran. It is part of Greater Isfahan Region, southwest of Isfahan, Iran. At the 2006 census, its population was 10,325, in 2,911 families.

For its public transit system, The city is served by Falavarjan County Municipalities Mass Transit Organization bus network route 7.

References

Populated places in Falavarjan County

Cities in Isfahan Province